Sphenovipera jimmysjoyi is an extinct species of sphenodontian dated from the Middle Jurassic. If was discovered in the lower part of the La Boca Formation located in Tamaulipas, Mexico. Only the lower jaw of this organism has been discovered and studied. It is possibly the only species of rhynchocephalian yet discovered to show evidence of venom delivery.

Etymology
Sphenovipera was named by Reynoso in 2005. The name alludes to sphenodontians via Spheno- and -vipera is Latin for "venomous snake."

Venom delivery
The mandible of Sphenovipera jimmysjoyi has several characteristics indicative of venom delivery. This includes large curved fangs with grooves seen in other animals that use low-pressure venom delivery, such as colubrid snakes.

References

Sphenodontia
Jurassic reptiles of North America
Prehistoric reptile genera